The men's 20 kilometres race walk at the 2012 Summer Olympics in London took place on 4 August on a route along The Mall and Constitution Hill in central London.

Robert Heffernan and Grzegorz Sudol took the early lead, soon joined by Yusuke Suzuki.  Like a bicycle race, the unheralded Suzuki steadily broke away from the peloton.  Suzuki led past the 8k mark but was eventually swallowed by a group led by Wang Zhen, followed by his teammate Chen Ding and Valeriy Borchin.  By the half way mark the lead pack was down to twelve.    Around the 11K mark, leader Wang made an odd gesture, hand over head, to the pack behind him, moments later Bertrand Moulinet broke away from the pack as Wang slowed.  After gaining as much as a seven-second lead, the chasers caught back up to Moulinet and left him to fall off the pace, while Chen took his turn to break off the front as the pack started to string out in chase. Wang, Borchin and Erick Barrondo were the strongest chasers, forming a pack of four.  A few minutes later Vladimir Kanaykin, then Luis Fernando López managed to bridge back to the leaders.  Moments after joining the lead group, Lopez  was given the red paddle, signifying his disqualification.  Kanaykin was also given the paddle a minute after that.  For a moment they were four abreast, but again Chen put the hammer down, eventually dropping Wang.  By the bell Chen had built an 8-second lead over Borchin, who was picking up warnings and cards from the judges.  Chen signaled one finger to the crowd.  As Borchin struggled, Wang zoomed past the two remaining chasers.  Barrondo reacted and accelerated to put some distance ahead of Wang.  An exhausted Borchin chased for only a few moments then collapsed into a fence alongside the course.  The third Chinese Zelin Cai hovered off the back of the pack and steadily picked off all the stragglers to eventually finish fourth for a remarkable 1-3-4 team performance.  A jubilant Chen celebrated all the way from the final turn.  Even though he gave up significant time along the way, Chen set a new Olympic Record at 1:18:46.  China's Chen Ding won the gold medal. Erick Barrondo from Guatemala won silver and Wang Zhen, also of China, took bronze.  Barrondo's silver medal was the first Olympic medal for Guatemala.

Schedule

All times are British Summer Time (UTC+1)

Records
, the existing World and Olympic records stood as follows.

The following new Olympic record was set during this event:

The following National records were set during this competition.

Result

References

Athletics at the 2012 Summer Olympics
Racewalking at the Olympics
Men's events at the 2012 Summer Olympics